Gorozhanka is a rural locality (a selo) in Gorozhanskoye Rural Settlement, Ramonsky District, Voronezh Oblast, Russia. The population was 428 as of 2010. There are 6 streets.

Geography 
Gorozhanka is located on the left bank of the Don River, 25 km northwest of Ramon (the district's administrative centre) by road. Petrovskoye is the nearest rural locality.

References 

Rural localities in Ramonsky District